Boidinia is a genus of crust fungi in the family Russulaceae. The genus is widely distributed, and contains 10 species. Boidinia was described in 1982 with the type species Boidinia furfuracea (formerly placed in Gloeocystidiellum). It is named in honor of French mycologist Jacques Boidin.

N. Maekawa (1994) wrote: "The genus Boidinia is a satellite genus of Gloeocystidiellum and differs from the latter in forming loose texture in subiculum and globose, echinulate to verrucose basidiospores."

Boidinia is probably not monophyletic and needs taxonomical redefinition.

Species
B. aculeata
B. borbonica
B. cana
B. dendrophysata
B. donkii
B. furfuracea
B. granulata
B. lacticolor
B. luteola
B. macrospora
B. permixta
B. peroxydata
B. propinqua

References

Russulales
Russulales genera